Dave Hickson may refer to:

 Dave Hickson (1929–2013), English professional footballer
 David J. Hickson (born 1931), British organizational theorist
 David Thomas Hickson (born 1967), South African film director, of Beat the Drum